Three monkeys may refer to:

 Three Monkeys (Üç Maymun), 2008 Turkish film
 Three wise monkeys